Vittorio Russo (born 16 February 1939 in Trieste) is an Italian football manager and former player. He last served head coach of Serie A outfit A.S. Livorno Calcio until October 2009.

Career
A former player with Sambenedettese, he started a coaching career, initially as a player/manager, and then focusing only on managerial duties. He also guided Pro Gorizia at Serie C2 level before to enter the Italian Football Federation as a technician, serving as an assistant to Rossano Giampaglia and Marco Tardelli with the Italy national under-21 football team. In 2005, he joined Triestina to guide the club's Under-19 team, and also guided the Serie B first team on an interim basis, together with general manager Francesco De Falco, from November 2005 to February 2006. He successively served as assistant coach to Walter Mazzarri at Sampdoria during the 2008–09 season.

In July 2009 he was appointed as head coach of newly promoted Serie A side Livorno, after the Italian federation rejected the club's appointment of former assistant Gennaro Ruotolo as permanent manager due to his lack of required coaching badges. Following this, Livorno were forced to look for a head coach with the required UEFA Pro License coaching badges, and Russo was therefore appointed, with Ruotolo appearing as assistant manager to him.

Russo's Livorno spell however lasted only a few months, as he and Ruotolo were both sacked on 21 October 2009 due to poor results.

References

1939 births
Living people
Footballers from Trieste
Italian footballers
Italian football managers
Serie A managers
A.S. Sambenedettese players
U.S. Triestina Calcio 1918 managers
U.S. Livorno 1915 managers
Association footballers not categorized by position

it:Vittorio Russo